Jo Yun-suk (born March 18, 1975), known by the stage name Lucid Fall, is a South Korean singer-songwriter.  He began his music career in 1997 as a member of the band Misoni, but has been most prolific as a solo artist, having released nine studio albums since 2001. Lucid Fall's musical style incorporates folk, pop, and bossa nova. Since moving to Jeju Island in 2014 and becoming a tangerine orchardist, his output has also included ambient compositions. He uses a nylon guitar as his primary instrument and is known for his poetic lyrics.

Biography
Lucid Fall was born Jo Yun-suk in 1975 in Seoul, South Korea. His family moved to Busan where he spent most of his childhood and attended high school.

Musical career
In 1993, Lucid Fall won the bronze award at the 5th Yoo Jae-ha Music Contest (유재하 음악경연대회) with "A Song of Mirror". He formed the band Misoni in March 1997, serving as a lead vocalist and guitarist. They performed around Hongdae and eventually released their debut album Drifting in 1999. After Misoni halted activities due to members' military service, he formed the one-man band Lucid Fall and released the self-titled album Lucid Fall on Radio Music. He worked on the original soundtrack of the movie L'abri in 2002. In 2005, he released his second studio album, Oh, Love, with the album's title track winning the award for Best Pop Song at the 2006 Korean Music Awards. In 2007, he released a live album, Light of Songs, and a third studio album, A Night at the Border. In December 2009, he released the fourth studio album Les Misérables.

Research career
Lucid Fall graduated Seoul National University majoring in chemical engineering in 1999. He moved to Europe for his study and received a licentiate of materials science at Royal Institute of Technology (KTH), Sweden in 2004. He then moved to Lausanne, Switzerland and got his PhD in bioengineering at École Polytechnique Fédérale de Lausanne (EPFL) in 2008, for research in drug delivery systems. His paper, "Micelles of Delivery of Nitric Oxide", was published in the Journal of the American Chemical Society in September 2009. Having spent seven years as a researcher, he returned to South Korea in late 2009 for a life as a full-time musician, no longer pursuing an academic career.

Discography

Studio albums
 Lucid Fall (2001)
 Oh, Love (오, 사랑; 2005)
 Night at the Border (국경의 밤; 2007)
 Les Misérables (레미제라블; 2009)
 Beautiful Days (아름다운 날들; 2011)
 Flowers Never Say (꽃은 말이 없다; 2013)
 Someone, Somewhere (누군가를 위한; 2015)
 Living Small and Tiny Farm (2017)
 Nowana (2019)

Live albums
 Light of Songs (2007)

Soundtrack albums
 L'Abri (버스, 정류장; 2002)

Filmography

Web show

Awards

References

External links
 Official homepage (Korean)

1975 births
Living people
K-pop singers
Singers from Seoul
Seoul National University alumni
South Korean expatriates in Sweden
South Korean expatriates in Switzerland
École Polytechnique Fédérale de Lausanne alumni
KTH Royal Institute of Technology alumni
Antenna Music artists
Korean Music Award winners
21st-century South Korean male  singers
South Korean male singer-songwriters